Zlatko Hebib (born 28 December 1990) is a Swiss footballer who plays for FC Zürich II.

Career
Hebib was born in Dubrovnik, SR Croatia, SFR Yugoslavia, but moved to Switzerland at an early age. He joined Grasshopper Club Zürich as a 7-year old, coming through the ranks of the Swiss club, but not having made a first team appearance. After a season spent at Yverdon-Sport FC and four months spent without a team, Hebib joined SV Babelsberg 03 in November 2011. The Swiss youth international made his professional debut in the German 3. Liga in a 3–1 away win over VfR Aalen.

In July 2017, Hebib joined FC Stade Nyonnais. Two years later, he joined FC Rapperswil-Jona.

References

External links 
 
 

1990 births
Living people
People from Dubrovnik
Footballers from Zürich
Croatian emigrants to Switzerland
Swiss men's footballers
Association football defenders
3. Liga players
Swiss Challenge League players
Swiss Promotion League players
Grasshopper Club Zürich players
Yverdon-Sport FC players
SV Babelsberg 03 players
FC Biel-Bienne players
Servette FC players
FC Winterthur players
FC Stade Nyonnais players
FC Rapperswil-Jona players
FC Zürich players
Expatriate footballers in Germany